George Boscawen, 3rd Viscount Falmouth, PC (6 May 1758 – 11 February 1808), was a British army officer and statesman in the late 18th and early 19th centuries. This included service as Captain of the Honourable Corps of Gentlemen-at-Arms in the reign of George III.

Life and career
Boscawen was the third and youngest, but only surviving son of Admiral Edward Boscawen (1711–1761) by his marriage to Frances Glanville (1719–1805). In 1774 he joined the British Army as a cornet, but eventually reached the rank of colonel in 1795. Whilst serving as an officer he succeeded his uncle as Viscount Falmouth in 1782 and took his place in the House of Lords.

He was the chief justice in the Eyre North of Trent from 1789 to 1790, when he was raised to the position of captain of the Honourable Corps of Gentlemen-at-Arms, serving in 1790–1806 and from 1807 until his death in 1808. At the same time, he was made a privy councillor.

Family
On 29 June 1784, Falmouth married Elizabeth Anne Crew by special licence, as she was a minor at the time. They had three children:
Edward Boscawen, 1st Earl of Falmouth (10 May 1787 – 29 December 1841)
John Evelyn Boscawen (1790 – 12 April 1851), canon of Canterbury Cathedral
Anne Evelyn Boscawen (23 November 1791 – 5 March 1871)

Falmouth's wife died on 10 August 1793, and upon his own death in 1808, his estate and titles passed to his eldest son.

In fiction
Named as Lord Falmouth, he is a recurring character in the Poldark novels by Winston Graham, where he is presented as the dominant political figure in Cornwall in his time, due to his unashamed use of patronage and his influence over Parliamentary elections. He appears personally a somewhat distant and arrogant man, but capable of kindness and acts of friendship.

In the 2015 BBC TV series based on the books, Lord Falmouth is played by James Wilby.

Ancestry

References

External links

|-

1758 births
1808 deaths
Viscounts in the Peerage of Great Britain
Members of the Privy Council of Great Britain
George
Honourable Corps of Gentlemen at Arms